Campbell is an unincorporated community in Delta County, in the U.S. state of Michigan.

History
The community was named for Robert Campbell, a railroad contractor.

References

Unincorporated communities in Delta County, Michigan